After the Burial is an American progressive metal band from Minneapolis, Minnesota. They are currently signed to Sumerian Records and have released five of their six full-length albums through the label. Since their inception in 2004, the band has gone through two vocalist changes, two drummer changes, the departure and death of founding rhythm guitarist Justin Lowe, and the departure of bassist Lerichard Foral. Lead guitarist Trent Hafdahl remains the sole remaining founding member. They are considered key contributors to the development of subgenres such as djent and progressive metalcore.

History

Formation and Forging a Future Self (2004–2007)
After the Burial was founded in 2004 by Nick Wellner, Trent Hafdahl, Justin Lowe (born Justin A. Lowe in Flemington, New Jersey; December 17, 1982 – July 21, 2015), and Greg Erickson who all met in high school. Dave Coleman initially filled in on bass while they searched for a permanent member. After posting an ad on a Twin Cities hardcore message board, Lee Foral responded and earned a spot in the band.

The group's first album entitled Forging a Future Self was recorded in late 2005 and was released on March 1, 2006. It was distributed via Corrosive Records, though there was never an official record deal in place.

They would later sign to Sumerian Records where Erickson and Wellner departed and Grant Luoma (of local act Nostalia) joined as vocalist. Eric Robles took Erickson's place as drummer but also departed before the recording of the band's second album.

Rareform (2008–2009)

The band entered the studio in 2008 to record their second studio album Rareform. All drum programming was done by the band's then current rhythm guitarist Lowe, while Hafdahl handled the lyrical writing duties due to the lack of output by then current vocalist, Luoma.

Shortly after the release, vocalist Luoma was replaced. Anthony Notarmaso joined in his place, and the band recruited Dan Carle (also of Nostalia) on drums.

In late 2008, the band supported Suicide Silence on The Cleansing The Nation Tour, and in early 2009, co-headlined a U.S. tour with Veil of Maya.

The band decided to re-release Rareform with Notarmaso's vocals in September 2009. It also included bonus content, such as live footage from a sold-out concert the band performed at.

In 2018, the band did a 10-year anniversary tour for Rareform, alongside The Acacia Strain.

In Dreams (2010–2012)
The band's third full-length album, In Dreams was recorded and released in 2010 through Sumerian.

In late 2010, the band supported Winds of Plague on The December Decimation Tour, and in 2011, headlined the Crush Em' All Tour 2.

On March 14, 2011, an extended mix of the song "Pi (The Mercury God of Infinity)" was uploaded to YouTube.

This Life Is All We Have EP and Wolves Within (2013–2014)
On April 2, 2013, Sumerian Records posted a re-mastered version of the song "A Steady Decline" and stated:
"On April 1, 2006 After the Burial released their ground breaking album Forging a Future Self, which helped shape the sound of modern metal. To celebrate seven years of shred ATB has released a new take on an old favorite!"

On April 30, Sumerian Records uploaded three songs on their official YouTube channel for After the Burial's three song EP entitled This Life Is All We Have. The EP includes the following re-mastered songs from Forging a Future Self, featuring Anthony Notarmaso on vocals: "A Steady Decline", "Fingers Like Daggers", and "Redeeming the Wretched".

During live shows in 2013, After the Burial began playing two new songs called "A Wolf Amongst Ravens" and "Anti-Pattern" from their yet to be released album.

On November 5, 2013, Sumerian Records released the band's new song entitled "A Wolf Amongst Ravens" on YouTube and revealed the band's new album Wolves Within being release on December 17, 2013. They also resigned to Sumerian Records.

On November 18, 2013, the song "Of Fearful Men" was uploaded to YouTube and made available for purchase through iTunes and the entire album (Wolves Within) was released under Sumerian Records in December of the same year.

Justin Lowe's departure and death (2015)

Guitarist and founding member Justin Lowe officially announced he left the band on June 24, 2015: he posted a lengthy statement on social media, accusing both After the Burial, their record label (Sumerian Records) and most people in his life to be out to ruin him; MetalSucks described his statement as "barely-coherent" and suspected it's a result of "a paranoid episode". After the Burial responded to Lowe's open letter the following day confirming he was under severe mental distress and requested their fans to support Lowe during his time of recovery. Lowe was under care with his family at the time.

On the evening of July 20, 2015, Justin Lowe was pronounced officially missing, and search efforts had been put into place in order to find him. Lowe, aged 32, was found dead by a hiker on July 21, 2015, directly underneath the Soo Line High Bridge, while his car was found on the Minnesota side of the bridge. Authorities state that his death was consistent with that of a fall. It is currently unknown if the fall was accidental or intentional.

On July 27, the band released a statement on their Facebook page saying that they had decided not to perform on the Summer Slaughter tour in the wake of Lowe's passing, and that they needed time to recover from the loss of their friend.

Dig Deep and Lee Foral's departure (2016–2017)
On October 29, the band streamed the new track "Lost in the Static" and also announced a tour starting on November 5 in San Diego, being followed by The Faceless, Rings of Saturn and Toothgrinder. On New Years Day 2016, the band announced their new album Dig Deep, which was released on February 19, 2016.

On December 22, They were announced to be part of the Sumerian Records 10th Anniversary Tour with Born of Osiris, Veil of Maya, Erra and Bad Omens. The tour started on February 19 in Minneapolis.

In June 2016, Lee Foral announced his departure to focus on his family.

On December 3, 2016, Adrian Oropeza was announced as a full-time After the Burial member after the year of touring with them.

Evergreen (2018–present)
On May 1, 2018, lead guitarist Trent Hafdahl announced on Instagram that the band had begun work on their sixth album. On July 20, recording wrapped up.

On February 2, 2019, the band revealed that they would be shooting a music video for a song off the upcoming album the following weekend. On February 26, they released the music video for the album's first song "Behold the Crown" and also announced that their sixth album Evergreen would be released on April 19, 2019.

After the Burial supported Parkway Drive and Killswitch Engage on their "Collapse the World" tour throughout the Spring of 2019. Vein also took part on the show as support.

After the Burial opened up for As I Lay Dying on their "Shaped by Fire" tour with Emmure in the fall of 2019. After the Burial, Carnifex, Rivers of Nihil, and Undeath supported The Black Dahlia Murder on their tour "Up From the Sewer" in the summer of 2021.

In spring 2022, the band went on a tour with Thy Art Is Murder as a co-headliner.

Musical style
After the Burial's musical style has been described as progressive metal, metalcore, deathcore, and djent.

Members

Current
 
 Trent Hafdahl – lead guitar, backing vocals (2004–present); rhythm guitar, programming (2015–present)
 Anthony Notarmaso – lead vocals (2008–present)
 Dan Carle – drums (2008–present)
 Adrian Oropeza – bass (2016–present)

Former
 Greg Erickson – drums (2004–2006)
 Nick Wellner – lead vocals (2004–2007)
 Eric Robles – drums (2006–2008)
 Grant Luoma – lead vocals (2007–2008)
 Justin Lowe – rhythm guitar, programming (2004–2015; died 2015); drums (2008)
 Lerichard "Lee" Foral – bass (2004–2016)

Timeline

Discography

Studio albums

EPs

Singles

Music videos

References

2004 establishments in Minnesota
American deathcore musical groups
Metalcore musical groups from Minnesota
American progressive metal musical groups
Musical groups established in 2004
Musical quartets
Sumerian Records artists